The Tecate Divide is a mountain ridge in southeastern San Diego County, California, running in a north-south direction on the southeast fringe of the Cuyamaca Mountains.

The Tecate Divide is also a highway summit on Interstate 8. It is the fourth  highway summit east ward of San Diego through the Cuyamaca Mountains. The first highway summit had been unnamed until "Carpenter Summit" was proposed in late 2019, now pending with the United States Geological Survey. The second is Laguna Summit and the third is Crestwood Summit. 

The name "Tecate" is used for several other place names in southeastern San Diego County and across the border in Mexico, most notably for the city of Tecate.

References

Mountain passes of California
Interstate 8
Mountain ranges of San Diego County, California